Ascocratera is a genus of fungi within the Trypetheliaceae family. This is a monotypic genus, containing the single species Ascocratera manglicola.

References

External links
Ascocratera at Index Fungorum

Trypetheliaceae
Monotypic Dothideomycetes genera
Taxa named by André Aptroot